Berry Brow railway station serves the Huddersfield suburban villages of Berry Brow, Taylor Hill, Armitage Bridge and Newsome in the metropolitan borough of Kirklees in West Yorkshire.

The present single-platform station was opened by British Rail in 1989.

It opened on 1 July 1850 and closed on 2 July 1966.

Facilities
The station is unstaffed and has a basic shelter on its single platform; all tickets must be bought before boarding via the ticket machine or in advance.  Timetable posters and a digital display screen provide train running information.  Step-free access is via a steep ramp from the main road above.

Services
All services to the station are operated by Northern Trains. There is an hourly service in both directions on Monday to Saturdays, and on Sundays from mid-morning.

References

Holme Valley
Railway stations in Huddersfield
DfT Category F2 stations
Former Lancashire and Yorkshire Railway stations
Railway stations in Great Britain opened in 1850
Railway stations in Great Britain closed in 1966
Beeching closures in England
Railway stations opened by British Rail
Railway stations in Great Britain opened in 1989
Northern franchise railway stations
1850 establishments in England
1989 establishments in England